Shura Council elections were held in Egypt between 29 January and 22 February 2012. The Freedom and Justice Party emerged as the largest party in the council, winning 105 of the 180 elected seats.

Background

Parliamentary elections were held in late 2010 and were followed by controversy and repression as well as accusations of fraud.

Following similar events in Tunisia during the Arab Spring, Egyptian activists called for protesters to turn up in cities around Egypt on various specially-designated days of rages. Though violence was reported at some points, protests were largely peaceful with the army staying quiet until 10 February 2011, when calls for Hosni Mubarak to resign were at their peak. The following day, Vice President Omar Suleiman announced Mubarak's resignation from the presidency while turning power over to the military. The Supreme Council of the Armed Forces, headed by Field Marshal Mohamed Hussein Tantawi would lead the country for a transitional period until a civilian government takes over.

A constitutional referendum was then approved on 19 March.

Electoral system
At the time of the election the Shura Council had 270 seats, of which 90 were appointed and 180 elected. Of the 180 elected seats, 60 were elected by majority voting in single-member constituencies, and 120 by proportional representation based on the total number of votes cast in the constituencies. Voting was compulsory, with a potential £20 fine for non-voters.

Party lists had to include at least one woman candidate, and had to pass a 0.5% electoral threshold to win a proportional representation seat. For the constituency seats, candidates were required to win over 50% of the vote and for there to be either a farmer or worker elected from their constituency in order to be elected in the first round. Run-offs would be when no candidate won over 50% of the vote in a constituency, and in cases where two candidates achieved over 50%, but neither of them were workers or farmers, the candidate with the highest number of votes would be declared elected, and a run-off held between the highest ranking workers and farmers.

The elections were held in two stages; a first stage on 29 and 30 January, with run-offs on 5 and 6 February, and a second stage on 14 and 15 February, with run-offs on 21 and 22 February. There were originally plans to hold the elections in three stages, with the third stage taking place on 4–5 March and run-offs on 11–12 March, but in early January 2012, the election process was sped up to shorten the transition period.

Campaign
The liberal Free Egyptians Party announced a boycott of the elections, complaining about irregularities during the preceding parliamentary elections and denouncing the Shura Council elections as a "waste of time".

Results
The first phase included the governorates of Alexandria, Asyut, Cairo, Dakahlia, Damietta, Faiyum, Gharbia, Monufia, New Valley, North Sinai, Qena, Red Sea and South Sinai. Voter turnout for the first phase was at 15%, while turnout for its run-off was down to 6%.

The polls of the second phase were held in Giza, Sharqiya, Kafr el-Sheikh, Qalyubia, Aswan, Sohag, Luxor, Beni Suef, Minya, Matrouh, Beheira, Suez, Ismailia and Port Said. The turnout in the second phase on 14–15 February was at 12.2%. According to the Higher Elections Commission, 3 million out of around 25 million eligible voters cast their votes. The number of invalid votes was 252,899.

Aftermath
During the first Shura Council session on 28 February 2012, FJP member Ahmed Fahmy was elected speaker.

References

Elections in Egypt
Egypt
Shura Council election
2012 election
Shura Council election
Egyptian Crisis (2011–2014)
Egyptian Shura Council election
Egyptian Shura Council election
Election and referendum articles with incomplete results